"Thrill Me" is a song by British soul and pop band Simply Red. Written by lead singer Mick Hucknall and Fritz McIntyre, it was released in April 1992 as the fourth single from their fourth album, Stars (1991). The song reached number 33 on the UK chart in May 1992. It also reached number five in Zimbabwe, number 30 in Ireland and number 58 in the Netherlands, as well as number six on the European Dance Radio Chart. It was later included on the band's compilation albums, Greatest Hits in 1996, Simply Red 25: The Greatest Hits in 2008 and Song Book 1985–2010 in 2013.

Critical reception
Adam Sweeting from The Guardian remarked the "rough-terrain sway" of "Thrill Me". A reviever from Liverpool Echo stated that on the song, Hucknall's voice "can still turn your spine to jelly". Pan-European magazine Music & Media wrote that the singer is "again gently shaking his red dreadlocks in a sensual dance rhythm." Alan Jones from Music Week named it Pick of the Week, adding that the song is "bound for the upper reaches of the chart. After the Granada documentary on the band on Sunday, it should also ensure that Stars continues to sell like hotcakes for the foreseeable future." 

In an retrospective review, Pop Rescue said it "feels much less structured and slower, and Mick's vocals and lyrics here are weaker", noting its saxophone solo. Karla Peterson from The Press-Courier described it as a "atmospheric ballad". Al Walentis from Reading Eagle viewed the song as "high-spirited". Johnny Dee from Smash Hits gave it three out of five and described it as a "seriously jazzy meandering, that snoozes along in a relaxing Sunday lay-in fashion." Another editor, Polly Birkbeck, felt the song is "quite a stonker with plinky plonky Elton John piano".

Music video
A music video was produced to promote the single. It was directed by Steven Lock and shows the band performing at a concert.

Track listing

Charts

References

1992 singles
Simply Red songs
Songs written by Mick Hucknall
1991 songs
Songs written by Fritz McIntyre